Symplocos buxifolioides is a tree in the family Symplocaceae, native to Borneo. The specific epithet buxifolioides refers to the species' resemblance to Symplocos buxifolia.

Description
The curved twigs are brown to black. The inflorescences feature racemes bearing one to three white flowers.

Distribution and habitat
Symplocos buxifolioides is endemic to Borneo, where it is known only from Mount Kinabalu in Sabah.

Conservation
Symplocos buxifolioides has been assessed as vulnerable on the IUCN Red List. With its very small population, extreme rainfall and/or landslides could push the species towards critical endangerment. Being in Kinabalu Park affords the species a level of protection.

References

buxifolioides
Endemic flora of Borneo
Plants described in 2003
Flora of Mount Kinabalu